Qarqojoq (also Romanized as Qārqojoq; also known as Qaramjoq) is a village in Maraveh Tappeh Rural District, in the Central District of Maraveh Tappeh County, Golestan Province, Iran. At the 2006 census, its population was 457, in 88 families.

References 

Populated places in Maraveh Tappeh County